True Beauty is a television series in which contestants are competing to see who is the most beautiful. However, they think they are only being tested on outer beauty. The show is hosted by three judges, who judge the contestants on their inner beauty, in addition to their appearance. The contestants are competing for $100,000 and to be "featured in People magazine's 100 most beautiful people issue." The series is produced by Tyra Banks and Ashton Kutcher. It premiered on ABC on January 5, 2009. The second season premiered May 31, 2010.
It is listed as cancelled on tvseriesfinale.com.

Season 1 

The first season premiered on January 5, 2009 on ABC, and featured judges Vanessa Minnillo, Nolé Marin, and Cheryl Tiegs.  On the season finale, which first aired February 23, 2009, Julia Anderson was named the winner, with Joel Rush finishing second, and Billy Jeffrey in third place.

Season 2 

The second season premiered on May 31, 2010 on ABC, and featured judges Vanessa Minnillo, Carson Kressley, and Beth Stern. On the season finale, which aired July 19, 2010, Taylor Bills was declared the winner, placing Erika Othen in second and Craig Franczyk in third.

International airdates

References

External links 
 
 

2009 American television series debuts
2010 American television series endings
2000s American reality television series
2010s American reality television series
American Broadcasting Company original programming
Television series by Warner Horizon Television
America's Next Top Model